Nanipora is a monotypic genus of cnidarian in the family Lithotelestidae. It consists of one species, Nanipora kamurai.

Discovery
Nanipora kamurai was first discovered in a public swimming area in Okinawa. The species is considered to be a "living fossil" because the animals most closely related to it genetically are extinct.

References

Further reading
Cordeiro, R., van Ofwegen, L. & Williams, G. (2015). Nanipora kamurai Miyazaki & Reimer, 2015 at the WoRMS Web-site. Retrieved from the World List of Octocorallia data-base.

Lithotelestidae
Octocorallia genera
Monotypic cnidarian genera